Ytterbium iodide may refer to:
 Ytterbium(II) iodide (ytterbium diiodide), YbI2
 Ytterbium(III) iodide (ytterbium triiodide), YbI3